In mathematics, a cubic form is a homogeneous polynomial of degree 3, and a cubic hypersurface is the zero set of a cubic form.  In the case of a cubic form in three variables, the zero set is a cubic plane curve.

In , Boris Delone and Dmitry Faddeev showed that binary cubic forms with integer coefficients can be used to parametrize orders in cubic fields.

The classification of real cubic forms  is linked to the classification of umbilical points of surfaces. The equivalence classes of such cubics form a three-dimensional real projective space and the subset of parabolic forms define a surface – the umbilic torus.

Examples
Cubic plane curve
Elliptic curve
Fermat cubic
Cubic 3-fold
Koras–Russell cubic threefold
Klein cubic threefold
Segre cubic

Notes

References

Multilinear algebra
Algebraic geometry
Algebraic varieties